The 2019–2021 polio outbreak in the Philippines was an epidemic. For the previous 19 years, the Philippines was free of any polio-related diseases. On September 14, 2019, the disease began to resurface through a positive test result done to a 3-year-old girl from Mindanao. After the confirmation of a second case from tests done on a 5-year-old boy, the government of the Philippines publicly declared a polio outbreak on September 19, 2019. On June 11, 2021, the WHO announced that the outbreak has ended.

According to the World Health Organization (WHO), the Philippines eradicated polio in 2000.

Epidemiology 
On September 19, 2019, a polio outbreak was reported in the Philippines. After two polio cases were reported, the authorities inspected several places including Metro Manila and Davao City. Samples taken from several places across Manila were confirmed to contain "vaccine-derived polio virus" type 2 (VDPV2), similar to the pathogen found on the first two confirmed cases. The government decided to vaccinate all the children regardless of whether they have been affected by polio or not. The Global Polio Eradication Initiative (GPEI) have worked with the government of the Philippines in a massive polio vaccination campaign; other NGOs like the Red Cross are also collaborating in the campaign as well.

Four cases have been confirmed as of November 5, 2019: the first was a three-year-old girl in Lanao del Sur with the other cases reported in Laguna, Maguindanao, and Sultan Kudarat. It is believed that the public's distrust in the country's poor healthcare system is a cause of the polio outbreak.

This is not the first disease outbreak in the Philippines in 2019. In February 2019, a measles outbreak occurred as a result of public distrust in the Philippines' poor healthcare system. As of January 2019, the Philippines has been combating a dengue outbreak, the worst dengue outbreak that the Philippines has experienced since 2012. Like the measles outbreak, the dengue outbreak was also caused by public distrust of the dengue vaccination campaign in 2012.

The World Health Organization and UNICEF Philippines, declared the official end of the polio outbreak on June 11, 2021, after the virus has not been detected in the past 16 months.

Response

Domestic 
During this epidemic, WHO, UNICEF and other private medical communities are working hand in hand to help the Philippines Department of Health in conducting enormous vaccination runs throughout Metro Manila, Davao City, Marawi, and other major cities in the country. The campaign sought to end the rise of the deadly virus. According to the Philippine Red Cross, the duration of the mass vaccination run happened between October 14 and 27, 2019; the number of children they aimed to have vaccinated is 65,000 children.

As of October 2, 2019, the International Federation of Red Cross and Red Crescent Societies (IFRC) has pledged US$336,700 from it relief funds in efforts to eradicate polio from the Philippines.

International 
Not only is the outbreak proving a risk to citizens of the Philippines, but other neighboring countries are keeping watch on the spread of the disease as well. An advisory was released by the Embassy of the Republic of Indonesia to the Philippines, in aiming to prevent the spread of polio.

References 

2019 disease outbreaks
2020 disease outbreaks
2021 disease outbreaks
2019 disasters in the Philippines
2020 disasters in the Philippines
2021 disasters in the Philippines
Polio
Infectious diseases with eradication efforts
Disease outbreaks in the Philippines